Arixiuna is a genus of longhorn beetles of the subfamily Lamiinae, containing the following species:

 Arixiuna longula (Bates, 1881)
 Arixiuna prolixa (Bates, 1872)
 Arixiuna varians (Bates, 1881)

References

Hemilophini